The irresistible force paradox (also unstoppable force paradox or shield and spear paradox), is a classic paradox formulated as "What happens when an unstoppable force meets an immovable object?" The immovable object and the unstoppable force are both implicitly assumed to be indestructible, or else the question would have a trivial resolution. Furthermore, it is assumed that they are two entities.

The paradox arises because it rests on two incompatible premises—that there can exist simultaneously such things as unstoppable forces and immovable objects.

Origins 
An example of this paradox in eastern thought can be found in the origin of the Chinese word for contradiction. This term originates from a story (see ) in the 3rd century BC philosophical book Han Feizi. In the story, a man was trying to sell a spear and a shield. When asked how good his spear was, he said that his spear could pierce any shield. Then, when asked how good his shield was, he said that it could defend from all spear attacks. Then one person asked him what would happen if he were to take his spear to strike his shield;  the seller could not answer. This led to the idiom of "zìxīang máodùn" (自相矛盾, "from each-other spear shield"), or "self-contradictory".

Another ancient and mythological example illustrating this theme can be found in the story of the Teumessian fox, which can never be caught, and the hound Laelaps, which never misses what it hunts. Realizing the paradox, Zeus, Lord of the Sky, turns both creatures into static constellations.

Applications 
The problems associated with this paradox can be applied to any other conflict between two abstractly defined extremes that are opposite.

One of the answers generated by seeming paradoxes like these is that there is no contradiction – that there is not a false dilemma. Christopher Kaczor suggested that the need to change indicates a lack of power rather than the possession thereof, and as such a person who was omniscient would never need to change their mind – not changing the future would be consistent with omniscience rather than contradicting it.

Cultural references

In Iain Banks's novel, Walking on Glass, a solution to the paradox is given.

The 2005 video game Phoenix Wright: Ace Attorney retells the story of the spear and shield from Han Feizi during its fifth case. A "King of Prosecutors" trophy that homages the story, depicting a cracked shield and a broken halberd, becomes an important piece of evidence during the case's events.

In the 2008 superhero film The Dark Knight, the Joker makes the statement on Batman's daring and finally successful attempt at capturing him, by saying "This is what happens when an unstoppable force meets an immovable object". The quote has become iconic amongst fans of the film series.

In the Johnny Mercer song  Something's Gotta Give the opening line paraphrases the paradox by saying "When an irresistible force such as you meets an old immovable object like me".

In the MOBA game League of Legends, the champion Xin Zhao wields a spear and has the line "Find me an immovable object, and I'll put this question to rest." His ultimate move, Crescent Guard, creates a circle around him and makes him impervious to damage dealt by champions outside that circle, implying he is an unstoppable force.

In Pokémon Sword and Shield, Zacian and Zamazenta, two Pokemon, are hinted to be an unstoppable sword and impenetrable shield. The two have the same total base stats, one having a higher attack stat and the other having a better defense stat.

Pro wrestling commentator Gorilla Monsoon referred to the WrestleMania III match between Hulk Hogan and André the Giant as "The irresistible force meets the immovable object".

In The Rising of the Shield Hero, during the event where the Shield Hero and the Spear Hero had a duel for the first time, the both of them make a few comments on "the tale about the all-penetrating Spear and the unbreakable Shield".

See also
 Newton's Flaming Laser Sword
 Omnipotence paradox

References

Paradoxes
Force
Infinity